Taonius borealis is a glass squid belonging to the genus Taonius. It is found in the North Pacific Ocean.

Taonius borealis is a transparent to dark purple color. They have tentacles or arms, and each arm consists of two suckers per row. The tentacular club armature consists of four hooked suckers per row, medial suckers with one or two large hooks and several small cusps. The maximum size is  mantle length. Their regular habitat is mesopelagic to bathypelagic. They mostly feed on shrimps, small fishes, including myctophids, and other squids. Predators include whales, sharks, and squids.

References 

Squid
Molluscs described in 1972